= Villa Las Pirquitas =

Coordinates: 28°16′48″S 65°43′55″W

- Municipality and village
- Interactive map of Villa Las Pirquitas
- Country: Argentina
- Province: Catamarca Province
- Time zone: UTC−3 (ART)

Villa Las Pirquitas is a village and municipality in Catamarca Province in northwestern Argentina.
